is a Japanese manga artist. He won the Award for Excellence at the 4th Tezuka Osamu Cultural Prize and the Award for General Manga at the 21st Kodansha Manga Award for Dragon Head.

Works
 Zashiki Onna
 Batāshi Kingyo
 Dragon Head (1995-2000)
 Chiisakobee (2012–2015)
 Isle of Dogs (2018)

References

External links

1961 births
Living people
Manga artists from Kanagawa Prefecture
People from Yokohama